The 1962 Southeastern 500 was a NASCAR Grand National Series event that was held on July 29, 1962, at Bristol International Speedway in Bristol, Tennessee.

The transition to purpose-built racecars began in the early 1960s and occurred gradually over that decade. Changes made to the sport by the late 1960s brought an end to the "strictly stock" vehicles of the 1950s.

Race report
A lineup of 44 American-born drivers made the starting grid for this 500-lap event. Fireball Roberts earned the pole position with a lap of  qualifying. Approximately 4% of this race was run under a caution flag. The model years ranged from 1960 to 1962; with most drivers using a Pontiac or a Chevrolet. Although official NASCAR records state that Joe Weatherly started in 13th place, he often preferred to call the position as "12A."

While Fireball Roberts and Junior Johnson dominated the first 100 laps, Fred Lorenzen and Jim Paschal would rule the final 100 laps of this race. Fifteen thousand fans would see an event that lasted three hours and nineteen minutes. Worth McMillion was the lowest-finishing driver to complete the event; he was 68 laps behind.

Although he was not a member of the Petty family, his victory was a great asset for Petty Enterprises and would eventually pave the way for non-family members to belong in the organization. Allan Harley was given the credit for the last-place finish due to car handling issues on lap 5. Eleven drivers did not have their winnings recorded by NASCAR officials. Notable crew chiefs in this race included Bud Moore, Herman Beam, Glen Wood, Banjo Matthews and Lee Petty.

Individual earnings for each driver varied from $3,930 ($ when adjusted for inflation) to $100 ($ when adjusted for inflation). The total purse for this event was $17,925 ($ when adjusted for inflation).

Qualifying

Failed to qualify: John Dodd Jr. (#38), Paul Lewis (#58), Darel Dieringer (#90), Al White (#31)

Top 10 finishers

Timeline
Section reference:

References

Southeastern 500
Southeastern 500
NASCAR races at Bristol Motor Speedway